The 2020 season of competitive association football in Malaysia.

Promotion and relegation 

Promoted to Malaysia Super League

 Sabah
 PDRM
 UiTM

Relegated to the Malaysia Premier League
 PKNS
 PKNP
 Kuala Lumpur

Promoted to Malaysia Premier League
 Kelantan United
 Kuching

Relegated to Liga M3
 Sarawak

Promoted to Liga M3

 KSR SAINS
 IKRAM Muda

Relegated to Liga M4
 Penjara

New and withdrawn teams

New teams 

 Semarak (Liga M3)
 Kuala Lumpur Rovers (Liga M3)
 Melaka United (Liga M3)

Withdrawn teams 
 Johor Bahru (Liga M3)
 SAMB (Liga M3)

National team

Malaysia national football team

Friendly
No friendly matches involving Malaysia was held from 1 January to 15 March due to no FIFA International Match Calendar window during that time, and after 15 March because of restrictions due to COVID-19 pandemic in Malaysia.

2022 World Cup qualification
On 5 March 2020, FIFA announced that it would be monitoring the health situation in the region for possible rescheduling of matchdays 7 through 10 due to the COVID-19 pandemic. Later on 9 March, FIFA and AFC jointly announced that the matches on matchdays 7–10 due to take place in March and June 2020 were postponed, with the new dates to be confirmed. However, subject to approval by FIFA and AFC, and agreement of both member associations, the matches may be played as scheduled provided that the safety of all individuals involved meets the required standards. On 5 June, AFC confirmed that matchdays 7 and 8 were scheduled to take place on 8 and 13 October respectively while matchdays 9 and 10 were scheduled to kick off on 12 and 17 November. On 12 August, FIFA announced that the matches scheduled for October and November 2020 would be rescheduled to 2021.

Malaysia national under-19 football team

2020 AFC U-19 Championship 
The 2020 AFC U-19 Championship was originally scheduled to run between 14 and 31 October 2020, but was postponed twice due to the COVID-19 pandemic.It was later cancelled on 25 January 2021.

League season

Liga Super

Liga Premier

Liga M3 

The league was abandoned after only 2 games played due to COVID-19 pandemic in Malaysia.

Group A

Group B

Domestic Cups

Charity Shield

FA Cup

Malaysia Cup

Malaysia Challenge Cup

Malaysian clubs in Asia

Johor Darul Ta'zim

AFC Champions League

Group stage

Kedah

AFC Champions League

Qualifying play-offs

Notes

References